Direct injection may refer to: 
A music recording technique more commonly referred to as direct input
Direct fuel injection, a method of fuel injection for an internal combustion engine
 Direct injection diesel
 Gasoline direct injection
Direct injection launch, a method of launching a spacecraft toward the moon or interplanetary space without the use of a temporary parking orbit